The Roman Catholic Diocese of Nkongsamba is a Latin suffragan diocese in the Ecclesiastical province of Douala in Cameroon.

Its cathedral episcopal see is the Cathédrale de l’Immaculée Conception, dedicated to the Immaculate Conception at Nkongsamba, in Moungo Department in the Littoral Region (Cameroon).

Statistics 
As of 2014, it pastorally served 148,062 Catholics (42.4% of 349,270 total) on 4,057 km2 in 505 parishes, 3 missions with 80 priests (67 diocesan, 13 religious), 130 lay religious (41 brothers, 89 sisters) and 40 seminarians.

History 
Established on April 28, 1914, as Apostolic Prefecture of Adamaua, an immense territory on the Adamawa Pateau, split off from the much vaster still Apostolic Vicariate of Khartoum, in the then Anglo-Egyptian Sudan.

Renamed on June 11, 1923, as Apostolic Prefecture of Foumban, after its see F(o)umban.

Promoted on May 28, 1934, as Apostolic Vicariate of Foumban, hence entitled to a (titular) bishop.

It lost territory repeatedly : 
 on May 28, 1940, to establish the Apostolic Prefecture of Berbérati (now a bishopric in Central African Republic)
 April 28, 1942, to establish the then Apostolic Prefecture of Niamey (in Niger)
 January 9, 1947, to establish the Apostolic Prefecture of Garoua and Apostolic Prefecture of Fort-Lamy (Chad)

On September 14, 1955, it was promoted and renamed as Diocese of Nkongsamba after its present see.

Bishops

Ordinaries
(all Roman rite)
Apostolic Prefects of Adamaua  
 Father Gerhard Lennartz, Dehonians (S.C.I.) (April 29, 1914 – 1919)
 Fr. Joseph Donatien Plissonneau, S.C.I. (February 7, 1920  – June 11, 1923 see below)

Apostolic Prefects of Foumban  
 Fr. Joseph Donatien Plissonneau, S.C.I. (see above June 11, 1923 – 1930)
 Fr. Paul Bouque, S.C.I. (October 28, 1930  – May 28, 1934 see below)

 Apostolic Vicar of Foumban  
 Paul Bouque, S.C.I. (see above May 28, 1934  – September 14, 1955 see below), Titular Bishop of Vagada

Suffragan Bishops of Nkongsamba 
 Paul Bouque, S.C.I. (see above September 14, 1955  – June 16, 1964), Titular Bishop of Abbir Germaniciana (June 16, 1964 – death August 11, 1976)
 Albert Ndongmo (June 16, 1964  – January 29, 1973), first native incumbent 
 Thomas Nkuissi (November 15, 1978  – November 21, 1992)
 Dieudonné Watio (April 1, 1995  – March 5, 2011), appointed	 Bishop of Bafoussam
 Dieudonné Espoir Atangana (May 26, 2012 - ...)

Other priest of this diocese who became bishop
Abraham Boualo Kome, appointed Bishop of Bafang in 2012

See also 
 Roman Catholicism in Cameroon

References

External links 
 GCatholic.org

Roman Catholic dioceses in Cameroon
Christian organizations established in 1914
Roman Catholic dioceses and prelatures established in the 20th century
Roman Catholic Ecclesiastical Province of Douala